

C 

 

C